One Owner Heart is the thirteenth studio album by American country music artist T. G. Sheppard. It was released in 1985 via Warner Bros. and Curb Records. The album includes the singles "One Owner Heart" and  "You're Going Out of My Mind"

Track listing

Chart performance

References

1984 albums
T. G. Sheppard albums
Albums produced by Jim Ed Norman
Warner Records albums
Curb Records albums